The 2011 NCAA Division I men's soccer season was the 53rd year of organized men's college soccer in the United States.

The season was divided into three parts; the regular season, which started with early season tournaments against intraconference opponents, before the second half of the regular season that featured interconference matches. The regular season was held from late August to early November 2011. In mid-November, the conference tournaments were held, and from mid-November to mid-December, the NCAA Tournament was held.

The national champion was the North Carolina Tar Heels whom won the title against the Charlotte 49ers. It was North Carolina's third national championship, and Charlotte's first ever appearance in an NCAA final of any sport.

Season headlines 

Throughout the course of the regular season, six different men's college soccer programs topped the rankings. The Connecticut Huskies were ranked first for four consecutive weeks, being the longest streak to do so in the season. At the end of the regular season, the New Mexico Lobos were the only college team in the nation to remain undefeated, winning 16 matches and only drawing twice.

Changes from 2010

Coaching changes 

The following is a list of head coaching changes prior to the start of Division I men's soccer season.

Rule changes

Season overview

Pre-season polls 

Several American soccer outlets posted their own preseason top 25 rankings of what were believed to be the strongest men's collegiate soccer teams entering 2011.

Regular season

Early season tournaments

Conference standings 
Key

Conference regular season and tournament winners 
Thirty athletic conferences each end their regular seasons with a single-elimination tournament. The teams in each conference that win their regular season title are given the number one seed in each tournament. The winners of these tournaments receive automatic invitations to the 2011 NCAA Division I Men's Soccer Championship. The Ivy League does not have a conference tournament, instead giving their automatic invitation to their regular-season champion.

Major upsets 

In this list, a "major upset" is defined by a team that's ranked 10 or more spots lower, or an unranked team that defeats a team ranked #15 or higher.

Key matches

Statistical leaders

Overall 

Top scorers

Last updated on December 23, 2011. Source: NCAA.com - Total GoalsMost assists

Last updated on December 23, 2011. Source: NCAA.com - Total Assists

Per match

NCAA tournament

College Cup – Hoover, Alabama

Award winners

NSCAA/Continental Tire Men's NCAA Division I All-America Team 

On December 9, 2011, the National Soccer Coaches Association of America released their All-American teams for the 2011 NCAA Division I men's soccer season. The list included a first, second and third team.

First teamSecond team

Third team

See also 
 College soccer
 2011 in American soccer
 2011 NCAA Division I Men's Soccer Championship

References

External links 

 
NCAA